Lydia Kunz Venth (1858 – 23 May 1931) was an American composer and pianist.

Venth was born in Pennsylvania to John Jacob and Henrietta Schlatter Kunz. She was a largely self-taught pianist and composer who married violinist Carl Venth when she was 18 years old. They had a daughter named Elsa, and later divorced.

Lydia and Carl established the Venth Music School in Brooklyn in 1888. Lydia worked as an accompanist and taught piano at the school and privately after she and Carl divorced. He remarried in 1899 and moved to Texas.

Lydia's compositions for piano and organ include:

Air de Ballet 
Barcarolle
Brooklet 
Chanson du Berçeau
Evening
Lilalith
Mazurka
Moments Musicale
Pieviot
Serenta
Sonatina
Spring Song

References 

Women pianists
1858 births
1931 deaths
American women composers
Musicians from Pennsylvania